The Next Indian general election in Uttarakhand is expected to be held in or before May 2024 to elect the members of 18th Lok Sabha.

Candidates

Party-wise summary

References

Indian general elections in Uttarakhand
Uttarakhand